Ko Miso (born 4 September 1997) is a South Korean swimmer. She competed in the women's 50 metre freestyle event at the 2018 FINA World Swimming Championships (25 m), in Hangzhou, China.

References

External links
 

1997 births
Living people
South Korean female freestyle swimmers
Place of birth missing (living people)
21st-century South Korean women